This is the list of diplomatic missions of the Republic of the Congo, excluding honorary consulates.

Africa

Algiers (Embassy)

Luanda (Embassy)
Cabinda (Consulate-General)

 Yaoundé (Embassy)

 Bangui (Embassy)

 N'Djamena (Embassy)

 Kinshasa (Embassy)

Cairo (Embassy)

Malabo (Embassy)

 Addis Ababa (Embassy)

Libreville (Embassy)

 Abidjan (Embassy)

 Nairobi (Embassy)

 Tripoli (Embassy)

Rabat (Embassy)

 Windhoek (Embassy)

Abuja (Embassy)

 Kigali (Embassy)

Dakar (Embassy)

 Pretoria (Embassy)

Americas

 Brasilia (Embassy)

 Ottawa (Embassy)

 Havana (Embassy)

 Washington, D.C. (Embassy)

Asia

Beijing (Embassy)
Guangzhou (Consulate-General)

New Delhi (Embassy)

Tel Aviv (Embassy)

Tokyo (Embassy)

Ankara (Embassy)

Europe

Brussels (Embassy)

Paris (Embassy)

Berlin (Embassy)

 Rome (Embassy)

Rome (Embassy)

Moscow (Embassy)

 Stockholm (Embassy)

Multilateral organisations

Brussels (Mission to the European Union)

Geneva (delegation to the United Nations)
New York City (delegation to the United Nations)

Paris (delegation to the UNESCO)

Gallery

See also
Foreign relations of the Republic of the Congo

References

 Embassy of the Republic of the Congo in Washington, DC

 
Congo, R
Diplomatic missions